Sahdei Buzurg is a block in Vaishali district of Bihar.

Villages
Number of Panchayat : 11
Number  of Villages : 47

Villages

Population and communities
Male Population : 51928  (2009 ist.)
Female Population : 47532
Total Population : 99459
SC Total Population : 20090 
ST Total Population : 78 
Minority Total Population : 9231 
Population Density : 1133  
Sex Ratio : 916

Education
literacy rate : 52.5% (2001 ist.)
male literacy rate : 66.2%
Female literacy rate :15

ĢĢĢĢĢı.5 %

School
Primary School : 62 (2009 ist.)
Upper Primary School : 50

References 

Community development blocks in Vaishali district